Bromhexine is a mucolytic drug used in the treatment of respiratory disorders associated with viscid or excessive mucus. It was developed in the research laboratory of Boehringer Ingelheim in the late 1950s as an active ingredient for pharmaceutical use, patented in 1961, introduced in 1963 under the trademark of Bisolvon® and came into medical use in 1966.

Function
Bromhexine is intended to support the body's mechanisms for clearing mucus from the respiratory tract. It is secretolytic, increasing the production of serous mucus in the respiratory tract, which makes the phlegm thinner and less viscous. This contributes to a secretomotoric effect, allowing the cilia to more easily transport the phlegm out of the lungs. For this reason it is often added to cough syrups.

It has been shown to increase the proportion of serous bronchial secretion, making it more easily expectorated. It is indicated as "secretolytic therapy in bronchopulmonary diseases associated with abnormal mucus secretion and impaired mucus transport".

Bromhexine is contained in various formulations, high and low strength syrups 8 mg/5 ml, 4 mg/5 ml, tablets and soluble tablets (both with 8 mg bromhexine) and solution for oral use 10 mg/5 ml, adapted to the need of the patients. The posology varies with the age and weight, but there are products for all age groups from infant on. Bromhexine is well established and tolerated.

Brand names
 Barkacin
 Benadryl Chesty/Forte
 Bisolvon
 Brofentol
 Brofentol Plus
 Bromex
 Bromhexin
 Broncholyte Elixir
 Cofdex
 Duro-Tuss Chesty/Forte
 Dysolvon
 Flegamina
 Movex
 Mucolyte
 Paxirasol
 Robitussin Chesty/Forte
 Solvex
 Vasican
 Ventilate Forte (combination of bromhexine and salbutamol)

References

Antidotes
Expectorants
Anilines
Bromoarenes
Cyclohexyl compounds